Gervais's fruit-eating bat (Dermanura cinerea) is a bat species found in Brazil, French Guiana, Guyana, eastern Peru, Suriname and eastern Venezuela.

References

Dermanura
Bats of South America
Bats of Brazil
Mammals of French Guiana
Mammals of Guyana
Mammals of Suriname
Mammals of Venezuela
Fauna of the Amazon
Mammals described in 1856
Taxa named by Paul Gervais